Novorossiysky is a rural locality (a settlement) and the administrative center of Novorossiysky Selsoviet, Rubtsovsky District, Altai Krai, Russia. The population was 631 as of 2013. There are 6 streets.

Geography 
Novorossiysky is located 49 km north of Rubtsovsk (the district's administrative centre) by road. Aksyonovka is the nearest rural locality.

References 

Rural localities in Rubtsovsky District